Österhagen och Bergliden (or simply Österhagen) is a locality situated in Upplands-Bro Municipality, Stockholm County, Sweden with 213 inhabitants in 2010.

References 

Populated places in Upplands-Bro Municipality